Tangxi (<!—see MOS:ZH-->) is a rural town in Wucheng District of Jinhua, Zhejiang.  it had a population of 62,900 and an area of .

History
The history of Tangxi Town dates back to the Neolithic Age.

During the Spring and Autumn Period, Tangxi was under the jurisdiction of the Gumie Kingdom.

In 222 BC, Qin Shi Huang established Taiwei County here. Later its name was changed into Longqiu County.

In 931, during the Five Dynasties and Ten Kingdoms, Qian Liu founded the Wuyue Kingdom, Longqiu County was renamed Longyou County.

In 1471, in the 7th year of the Chenghua period of the Ming dynasty, Chenghua Emperor established Tangxi County here.

During the Guangxu reign of the Qing dynasty, American priest Weng Pixian came here to spread Catholicism. Then priest Yi Wensi founded a Catholic church here.

On December 28, 1958, Tangxi County was merged into Jinhua County.

Geography
The highest point in the town is Mount Jiufeng.

Attractions
Tangxi Chenghuang Temple is a folk temple and provincial level cultural heritage. It was first established in 1472, during the Ming dynasty, the modern temple was founded in 1866, in the late Qing dynasty.

Jiufeng Temple is a Buddhist temple on Mount Jiufeng, it was built in 502, under the Liang dynasty. The present version was completed in the Qianlong period of the Qing dynasty.

Notable people
 Tao Yuanming, poet in the Eastern Jin dynasty.
 Hu Sen, official in the Ming dynasty.
 Feng Zikai, painter.
 Wei Zuqing,  mediciner.

Gallery

References

Divisions of Wucheng District
Towns of Jinhua